Derby Museum may refer to:

Derby Museum and Art Gallery, Art gallery and museum in Derby, England
Kentucky Derby Museum
World Museum Liverpool (founded as Derby Museum)